Zuibaiji Dam is a gravity dam located in Fukuoka Prefecture in Japan. The dam is used for flood control and water supply. The catchment area of the dam is 7.2 km2. The dam impounds about 12  ha of land when full and can store 2420 thousand cubic meters of water. The construction of the dam was started on 1969 and completed in 1977.

References

Dams in Fukuoka Prefecture
1977 establishments in Japan